Lucien Bidinger (8 June 1917 – 14 December 1982) was a Luxembourgian racing cyclist. He rode in the 1939 Tour de France.

References

1917 births
1982 deaths
Luxembourgian male cyclists
Place of birth missing